Florian Gengel (27 June 1834, in Churwalden – 4 February 1905) was a Swiss politician and President of the Swiss Council of States (1878/1879).

Works

Further reading

External links 
 
 

1834 births
1905 deaths
People from Plessur District
Swiss Calvinist and Reformed Christians
Free Democratic Party of Switzerland politicians 
Members of the Council of States (Switzerland)
Presidents of the Council of States (Switzerland)